Jordan Bender (born July 9, 2001) is an American professional soccer player who plays as an attacking midfielder for Cape Town City of the South African Premier Division.

Club career

Orlando City
Having joined the Orlando City Development Academy (DA) aged 13 and captaining the U19 team in the process, Bender signed his first professional contract with Orlando City B (OCB), Orlando City's USL League One affiliate, on November 14, 2018. In December 2019, Bender signed a Homegrown contract with Orlando City ahead of the 2020 season. In doing so he became the first Orlando player to be signed to the senior team having directly come through both the academy and OCB.

Charlotte Independence loan
On May 6, 2021, Bender joined USL Championship team Charlotte Independence on loan for the 2021 season. He made his debut on May 14, 2021, as a 77th-minute substitute in a 3–0 win over Charleston Battery. He was recalled by Orlando City on September 1 having made 15 appearances. Bender had his contract option declined at the end of the 2021 season.

Cape Town City
In July 2022, Bender signed with South African Premier Division club Cape Town City.

International career 
In 2017, Bender received his first call-up to the United States U16 national team during their February training camp. In January 2020, Bender was called in to the U20 camp for two friendlies against Mexico as an injury replacement for Kevin Bonilla.

Career statistics 
As of August 28, 2021

References

External links 
 
 
 Jordan Bender at Orlando City B

2001 births
Living people
American soccer players
Association football forwards
Homegrown Players (MLS)
Orlando City SC players
Orlando City B players
Charlotte Independence players
Soccer players from Orlando, Florida
United States men's youth international soccer players
USL League One players
Major League Soccer players
USL Championship players
People from Lake Mary, Florida